Walter Alleyne Ireland (19 January 1871, Manchester – 23 December 1951) was a British traveller and author on the tropical colonies of the British empire.

Life
His mother was the biographer Annie Elizabeth Nicholson Ireland and his father was the journalist Alexander Ireland; his brother was the composer John Ireland. Educated at Manchester Grammar School and the University of Berlin, Alleyne Ireland visited Australia, Canada, India, Burma, the Malay Peninsula, Java, Borneo, French Indo-China, the Philippines, the West Indies and British Guiana. In 1902–1904 for the Times of London he wrote twelve articles on British colonial administration in the tropics. He lectured at Cornell University, the University of Chicago and the Lowell Institute and was on the staff of the New York World.

Alleyne Ireland served as one of Joseph Pulitzer's private secretaries, an experience he recorded in An Adventure with a Genius: Recollections of Joseph Pulitzer.

Selected works

References

External links
 

1871 births
1951 deaths
British non-fiction writers
British male writers
Fellows of the Royal Geographical Society
Writers from Manchester
People educated at Manchester Grammar School
Male non-fiction writers